Paul Finlay is an Irish Gaelic footballer who plays for Ballybay Pearse Brothers. He played at senior level for the Monaghan county team between 2002 and 2016.

Finlay is the son of former Monaghan footballer Kieran "Jap" Finlay. He won an All-Ireland title with the Monaghan Vocational Schools and played a role in Sligo IT's Sigerson Cup win in 2002. He has also won Minor and Intermediate medals with Ballybay Pearses. Finlay was first selected for the Monaghan senior team in 2003. He was regarded as the team's playmaker and participated in their 2005 National Football League Division Two win, Monaghan's first national title in twenty years. In 2008 Finlay was called up to the Ireland international rules football team as a replacement for Tommy Walsh of Kerry.

Honours
 Ulster Senior Football Championship (2): 2013, 2015
 National Football League, Division 2 (2): 2014, 2005
 National Football League, Division 3 (1): 2013
 Monaghan Senior Football Championship (2): 2012, 2022

References

External links
 Paul Finlay interview 
 Monaghan on Hoganstand.com
 Monaghan GAA site 

Year of birth missing (living people)
Living people
Ballybay Pearses Gaelic footballers
Monaghan inter-county Gaelic footballers